The speckled piculet (Picumnus innominatus) is a species of bird in the family Picidae. It was defined by Burton in 1836.

Description
The male and female birds look alike. They have olive-green backs, with two white stripes on the side of their heads. The male bird has orange and brown on the forecrown. They have a creamy-white coloring below, with black spots. There is a dark green band near the eyes.

Distribution and habitat
It is found in the Indian subcontinent and Southeast Asia, ranging across Bangladesh, Bhutan, Cambodia, Hong Kong, India, Indonesia, Laos, Malaysia, Myanmar, Nepal, Pakistan, Thailand, Tibet and Vietnam. Its natural habitats are boreal forests, subtropical or tropical moist lowland forest, and subtropical or tropical moist montane forest. In India, it is found in the Himalayan foothills, up to an altitude of about 2500m. It can be found in bamboo jungles.

Behavior
They usually move about in pairs, on thin branches, and sometimes hang from the branch, upside-down. Their behavior is quite similar to that of woodpeckers.

Diet and feeding
The speckled piculet has a diet consisting of ants and termites.

Subspecies 
The speckled piculet has three subspecies;

 Picumnus innominatus chinensis (Hargitt, 1881)
 Picumnus innominatus innominatus (Burton, 1836)
 Picumnus innominatus malayorum (Hartert, 1912)

References

speckled piculet
Birds of the Himalayas
Birds of Eastern Himalaya
Birds of India
Birds of South China
Birds of Southeast Asia
speckled piculet
Taxonomy articles created by Polbot